Korean native or Korean Native may refer to:

 Koreans, the indigenous ethnic group who mostly populate Korea
 Korean-native, an adjective referring to things endemic to Korea (e.g., wildlife of Korea) or associated especially with Korean culture (e.g., Korean folk-art) 
 The indigenous portion of Korean vocabulary, i.e. that which is neither Sino-Korean nor other foreign loanwords
 Korean Native cattle (Hanwoo or Hanu), one of the four indigenous breeds of domesticated cattle in Korea
 Korean Native pig, an indigenous breed of domesticated black swine in Korea